HMS Penguin was a Royal Navy  launched in 1813. In 1815  captured Penguin in a battle that took place after the end of the War of 1812. Hornet then scuttled Penguin as she was too damaged to merit keeping.

Service

Penguin was commissioned in November 1813 under Commander Thomas R. Toker. The next month Commander George A. Byron took over command. In June 1814 command transferred to Commander James Dickinson.

On 23 March 1815 Penguin encountered USS Hornet off Tristan da Cunha. In the ensuing single ship action, Penguin lost 10 men killed, including Dickinson, and had 28 wounded; she struck her colours after 22 minutes of combat. By contrast, the Americans only suffered one man killed and nine wounded, including Hornets captain, James Biddle. The Americans scuttled Penguin the next day as she was too damaged to keep.

The two vessels had been relatively evenly matched. Hornet had a slightly heavier armament as she had 20 cannon, two 12-pounder guns as bow chasers and eighteen 32-pounder carronades. She also had a crew of 146 officers and men, including 20 US Marines, less a prize crew that she had despatched. Penguins crew numbered 132 and included 12 extra Royal Marines.

However, what had proved decisive was the Americans' better gunnery.  Most of Hornets casualties were due to musketry fire from Penguin, i.e., from the Royal Marines, Penguins gunnery was abysmal as no cannon shots had hit Hornet.

Aftermath
The war had already ended at the time of the engagement, but none of the vessels had received the news. Shortly after the fight,  and  rendezvoused with Hornet at Tristan da Cunha. Tom Bowline embarked Penguins crew and took the prisoners to Rio de Janeiro, Brazil, where they received the news of the treaty. The crew arrived at Bahia on 26 April.

See also 
 Capture of HMS Penguin

Citations

References

External links
 
 Order book of the H.M.S. Penguin, 1808-1876 (bulk 1810-1814), MS 58 held by Special Collections & Archives, Nimitz Library at the United States Naval Academy

 

1813 ships
Brig-sloops of the Royal Navy
Cruizer-class brig-sloops
War of 1812 ships of the United Kingdom
Shipwrecks in the Atlantic Ocean